Boumalne Dades is a city in Tinghir Province, Drâa-Tafilalet, Morocco. According to the 2014 census, it had a population of 12,328.

Located at the edge of a desert plateau, at the outlet of the upper Dadès Valley (more than 1500 m high), Boulmane Dades is originated from an old way of transhumance, controlled by the Aït Atta Tribe of Jbel Saghro and also used by neighboring tribes of Mgouna, Aït Sedrate, Aït Hdiddou and Aït Marghad between summer pastures in the High Atlas and Saghro wintering ones. Most of its residents, like those of the Dades Valley, are berber people.

References

Populated places in Tinghir Province